Lake Mary is a lake in Douglas County, in the U.S. state of Minnesota.

Lake Mary was named for Mary A. Kinkaid, a pioneer who settled the area in 1861.

See also
List of lakes in Minnesota

References

Lakes of Minnesota
Lakes of Douglas County, Minnesota